Guo Chuwang was a patriot at the end of the Song Dynasty and a musician of the guqin who composer of the piece Xiaoxiang Shuiyun (瀟湘水雲).

References
Please see: References section in the guqin article for a full list of references used in all qin related articles.

Guqin players
Song dynasty musicians
12th-century Chinese musicians
13th-century Chinese musicians